Eurythenes atacamensis is a species of amphipod restricted to the Peru-Chile ocean trench.

References 

Crustaceans of South America
Crustaceans of the Pacific Ocean
Eurythenes
Crustaceans described in 2021